Aralakalmodi Dam is a gravity dam on the Arala river near Khed in state of Maharashtra in India.

Specifications

Purpose
 Irrigation

See also
 Dams in Maharashtra
 List of reservoirs and dams in India

References

Dams in Maharashtra
Dams completed in 2007
2007 establishments in Maharashtra